The Edward Sullivan House is a historic house in Winchester, Massachusetts.  This small,  story house was built around 1875, and is the best-preserved example of a 19th-century worker's cottage in the town.  It is three bays wide, with a side-gable roof, and simple vernacular Italianate styling.  It has almost no exterior architectural styling, except for a transom window and modest entablature over the front door.  The house is one of five owned by Edward Sullivan, a stonemason, and is located near St. Mary's Catholic Church, an area where many Irish immigrants sought to settle.

The house was listed on the National Register of Historic Places in 1989.

See also
 National Register of Historic Places listings in Winchester, Massachusetts

References

Houses on the National Register of Historic Places in Winchester, Massachusetts
Houses in Winchester, Massachusetts